The Palm Beach Mercantile Company is a historic site in West Palm Beach, Florida. It is located at 206 Clematis Street. On January 28, 1994, it was added to the U.S. National Register of Historic Places.

References

External links
 Palm Beach County listings at National Register of Historic Places
 Florida's Office of Cultural and Historical Programs
 Palm Beach County listings
 Palm Beach Mercantile Company

National Register of Historic Places in Palm Beach County, Florida
Buildings and structures in West Palm Beach, Florida